Zak Normandin (born January 29, 1984) is an American entrepreneur, product designer, and the Founder and CEO of Iris Nova, the parent company of NYC-based beverage brand DIRTY LEMON. He had previously founded Little Duck Organics, a privately held New York City based company focused on organic children's snacks. Normandin is best known for innovative consumer product package designs, advocacy of organic food products and development of the text-message based conversational commerce platform used by DIRTY LEMON and the portfolio of Iris Nova beverage brands.

Early life and career
Normandin was born in Leominster, MA. He began his career as a Marine Engineer in the United States Coast Guard. The inspiration to create a food company came after becoming a father, when he was unable to find healthy, sugar-free foods for his children. He started Little Duck Organics in his basement in 2009. The brand quickly gained popularity and helped him in raising funding rounds from notable angel investors and venture capitalists including Chris Burch and Tom First.

In 2011, at Natural Products Expo East, he was awarded Best Packaging for a design Normandin created for the Tiny Fruits product line. In 2012, Little Duck Organics was recognized in a round-up of the "World's Most Dazzling Trade-Show Exhibits" with Nintendo, Nike, and Red Bull.  In 2013, Little Duck Organics won the Most Innovative Award at Expo West 2013. Later in 2013, his company was awarded with the New Arrival Award - Best New Products of 2013, for its new product Mighty Oats.

Normandin worked on Plantable packaging for his product Mighty Oats that can yield vegetables if planted. As of 2014, Under his leadership, Little Duck Organics achieved a retail presence in more than 30 countries. In 2014, Normandin sold majority control of Little Duck Organics, and left the company to start a creative agency and product development house.

In 2015 Normandin co-founded DIRTY LEMON, which quickly garnered a celebrity following from the likes of Kate Hudson, Karlie Kloss, Mindy Kaling, and Cardi B. DIRTY LEMON is an omni-channel functional beverage brand with products which utilizes Iris Nova's SMS-based e-commerce platform, a technology ideated by Normandin.

In 2018, Normandin raised a $15M SEED round for Iris Nova, the parent company of DIRTY LEMON. The round of funding was led by Coca-Cola North America’s Venturing and Emerging Brands (VEB) unit with additional support from Greycroft, GGV Capital, Imaginary Ventures, CASSIUS Family, PLUS Capital, Nebari Ventures, Winklevoss Capital, Betaworks Ventures, and Lakehouse Ventures.

Awards and recognition
 In 2018, Normandin was recognized as a '2018 Visionary' by Consumer Goods Technology.
 In 2018, Normandin was recognized as a '2018 Total Retail Game Changer' by Total Retail.
 In 2019, Normandin was recognized as a '2019 Disruptive Innovation Leader' by INNOCOS.
 In 2019, Normandin was recognized as one of 2019's '100 Most Intriguing Entrepreneurs' by Goldman Sachs.
 In 2020, Normandin was recognized as one of 2020's '100 Most Intriguing Entrepreneurs' by Goldman Sachs.
 In 2021, Normandin was recognized as one of 2021's 'Most Daring Creators' by Boutique Leaders Lifestyle Association.
 In 2021, Normandin was recognized as one of 2021's '40 Under 40 Trailblazers Driving the Next Era of Retail' by design:retail and Retail Touchpoints.

References

External links
 Official website

1984 births
Living people
21st-century American businesspeople